Daniel Warren Johnson is a comic book artist and writer based in Chicago. He has worked on titles with Image Comics, Marvel Comics, and DC Comics. He also collaborated with colorist Mike Spicer beginning with Extremity. The men also worked together on the Wonder Woman: Dead Earth and Beta Ray Bill: Argent Star mini-series. He followed that up with a solo project, Do A Powerbomb in 2022. His works have been published in five languages.

He received the ComicBook.com Golden Issues Award for Best Artist in 2021. He was selected for his ability to illustrate fights and his empathy. For instance, he was nominated for IGN's Best Comic Book Artist of 2020 award for his powerful fight scenes in Wonder Woman: Dead Earth. He has subsequently been noticed for his work in Do a Powerbomb. In 2022, he received an award for Best Limited Series by the Eisner Awards.

Early life 
Originally from Massachusetts, Johnson has stated that his first introduction to comic books was Bill Watterson's Calvin and Hobbes. He has explained that he had a sheltered childhood, and wasn't allowed to read certain comics or watch certain cartoons as a child. Reading these stories as a kid inspired Johnson to start drawing. Johnson was homeschooled beginning in third grade and continuing until twelfth. He was tutored by a woman named Rosetta at a local art center, who he credits as being very influential for his career in art. Johnson went to college in Chicago to get a degree in teaching, before changing paths and getting a job as a patient transporter at a hospital. At his job at the hospital, Johnson would occasionally draw portraits of patients. After returning to teaching, Johnson's wife Rachel encouraged him to pursue a career in art.

Career 
Daniel Warren Johnson gained popularity through his first major web-comic Space Mullet that began in 2012 and ran until 2017. In 2014 Johnson collaborated with Donny Cates on the Dark Horse Comics published The Ghost Fleet. Continuing his partnership with Dark Horse Comics Space Mullet was printed and published in a trade paperback from the publisher in 2016. In 2015 Johnson pitched his creator owned series Extremity for Image Comics and Skybound Entertainment, but the series began coming out in 2017. his work for which was nominated for an Eisner Award in the following year for best limited series losing to Black Panther: World of Wakanda by Roxane Gay, Ta-Nehisi Coates, and Alitha E. Martinez from Marvel Comics. Extremity also marks the beginning of the collaboration between Johnson and colorist Mike Spicer. Johnson has stated that Extremity was a series that he wanted to feel like he was taking seriously, unlike Space Mullet before it. Johnson has discussed that he met with some Hollywood studio executives to discuss making Extremity into a movie, but these discussions ended up going nowhere due to the high budget that an adaptation would require. Following the completion of Extremity, Johnson moved to his next creator owned project, Murder Falcon. In the collected edition, Johnson shares a personal story at the start describing the comic's encapsulation of all the things that Johnson appreciates and holds dear, while also telling a story about being brave during the hardest times in life. The pair then went to DC Comics to work on their DC Black Label mini-series Wonder Woman: Dead Earth published from December 2019 - August 2020. The story is an alternate universe tale starring Wonder Woman in a post-apocalyptic world where nightmarish monsters roam the Earth. After the completion of Dead Earth, Spicer and Johnson went to Marvel Comics to collaborate of the mini-series Beta Ray Bill: Argent Star which ran from March to July in 2021. The duo then returned to creator owned work at Image Comics with Do A Powerbomb beginning in June of 2022 and finishing in December of the same year.

In addition to receiving the Comic book.com Golden Issues Award for Best Artist in 2021, he has also received an award from the Ohio Digital Library. In 2022, he received an award for Best Limited Series by the Eisner Awards. His works have been published in five languages.

References 

Wikipedia Student Program
American comics artists
Artists from Chicago
Writers from Chicago
Living people
Year of birth missing (living people)
Writers from Massachusetts